The 53° Targa Florio took place on 4 May 1969, on the Circuito Piccolo delle Madonie, Sicily (Italy).

Race

For this event Porsche deployed an unparalleled number of cars: among the factory-backed ones, six new 908/02 and a special 911R; several others were entrusted to privateers, mainly 911 and older prototype-class cars such as the 910 and 907.
With Ferrari without suitable cars even for their most loyal teams (such as Scuderia Filipinetti which was forced to use a cumbersome and outdated Lola T70), the only brand that could challenge Porsche was Alfa Romeo which deployed five Tipo 33/2 (including the one with enlarged 2.5L engine already driven by Nino Vaccarella in the 1968 event).

The event resulted in a one-sided race for the Porsche 908/02 which took first to fourth overall places, followed by an Alfa Romeo, and then by two 907. The local hero Vaccarella, teamed with Andrea de Adamich, had to retire during lap 6 for engine failure.

Official results

References

Targa Florio
Targa Florio